Phan Nguyên Hồng (Đức Thọ, 1935) is a Vietnamese academic who is a leading authority on the mangrove ecosystem in Asia, and was awarded the 2008 International Cosmos Prize in recognition of his work.

Hồng has been involved in comprehensive scientific research in Vietnam, where war and overdevelopment have had a devastating impact on its mangrove ecosystem. He has made a major contribution to the restoration of the mangrove forests. The Can Gio district, in particular, is an unprecedented example of the successful restoration and conservation of a mangrove forest.

Education and career
Education
1956    B.Sc., Hanoi Pedagogic University
1964    M.Sc. in Ecology, HUE
1970    PhD, Hanoi University of Education
Employment
1980－1991    Associate Professor of Hanoi University of Education
1991－2007    Professor of HNUE
1987－1994    Director of the Mangrove Ecosystem Research Centre (MERC),Hanoi University of Education (HUE)
1995－2002    Vice Director, Centre for Natural Resources & Environmental Studies (CRES), Vietnam National University, Hanoi (VNU)
2003－2007    Director of the Mangrove Ecosystem Research Centre (MERC),Hanoi University of
Education (HUE)

Honors
1997   People Teacher Title by the President of Vietnam
2000    Labour Award (1st level) rewarded by the President and Prime Minister of S.R. Vietnam
2005    Environment Prize rewarded by Ministry of Natural Resources 　&Environment.
Publications
1993    The Mangroves of Vietnam
2000    Ecological study of mangrove forest in Can Gio, Ho Chi Minh C City, Vietnam
2002    Mangrove Ecosystem in the Red River Coastal Zone –Biodiversity, Ecology, Socio-Economics, Management and Education
2006    The role of mangroves and coral reef ecosystems in natural 　　disaster mitigation and coastal life improvement

References

External links
Hanoi National University of Education 

Vietnamese academics
1935 births
Living people
Vietnamese biologists